This is the complete episode list for Pee-wee's Playhouse. A total of 45 half-hour episodes and 1 primetime special were recorded for CBS from 1986 until 1990.

Series overview

Episodes

Season 1 (1986)

Season 2 (1987)

Special (1988)

Season 3 (1989)
Season 3 only had two episodes, plus the primetime Christmas special, due to production being halted by the 1988 Writers Guild of America strike and also by the production of Big Top Pee-wee. On February 2, 1989, The Pittsburgh Press stated that both episodes had been completed, but it was unclear when they would air.  On March 26, The Courier stated in a Q&A that one of the episodes had already aired, but was unsure of the other one. Finally, on August 8, The Chillicothe Gazette stated that the other Season 3 episode would be shown with the ones from Season 4 in the Fall of that year.

Season 4 (1989)
Unlike before, the final two seasons were filmed back-to-back. On June 16, 1989, Marilyn Beck wrote in her Syndicated Gossip Column that Reubens would start production in July on 20 new episodes (10 for the 1989–90 Season and 10 for the 1990–91 Season), not counting the other Season 3 leftover.

Season 5 (1990)

References

External links

Pee-wee's Playhouse